The End of the Game is a 1919 silent film drama produced and directed by Jesse D. Hampton and starring J. Warren Kerrigan. It was distributed by W. W. Hodkinson Corporation and Pathé Exchange.

Cast
J. Warren Kerrigan - Burke Allister
Lois Wilson - Mary Miller
Gayne Whitman - Frank Miller(*as Alfred Whitman)
Jack Richardson - Dan Middleton
George Field - Four-Ace Baker
Milton Ross - Faro Ed
Walter Perry - Wild Bill
Elinor Fair - Mona
Bert Appling - Sheriff
Joseph J. Franz - Hotel Clerk (*as J.J. Franz)

Preservation status
The film is preserved in the Filmmuseum EYE Institut, Netherlands.

References

External links
The End of the Game at IMDb.com

1919 films
American silent feature films
Pathé Exchange films
American black-and-white films
Silent American drama films
1919 drama films
Films distributed by W. W. Hodkinson Corporation
1910s American films